Pathreela Raasta is a 1994 Indian Hindi-language action drama film directed by Ajay Kashyap, starring Dimple Kapadia, Varsha Usgaonkar, Sadashiv Amrapurkar and Mukesh Khanna in pivotal roles.

Plot 
The film revolves with underworld gang war between Gayatri and Tao.

Cast 
 Dimple Kapadia as Gayatri Sanyal
 Varsha Usgaonkar as Mona
 Sadashiv Amrapurkar as Ramakant Waghmare
 Mahesh Anand as Munna
 Mukesh Khanna as Inspector Arjun
 Divya Kumar as Inspector Pratap
 Raza Murad as Commissioner Saxena
 Reema Lagoo
 Shagufta Ali
 Poonam Dasgupta
 Deep Dhillon as Jagraal
 Satyen Kappu
 Jack Gaud as Amarkant
 Bob Christo as Juda
 Mac Mohan as Hariprasad Srivastava
 Chandrashekhar as Judge
 Gajendra Chauhan
 Kishore Bhanushali

Music
"Kangna Pehna De Sajan Tere Naam Ka" - Alka Yagnik, Kumar Sanu
"Aag Laga Ke Chale Ho Kaha" - Kumar Sanu, Alka Yagnik
"Choli Aur Ghaghra Rang Daalo Na" - Kavita Krishnamurthy, Udit Narayan
"Mai Hu Tera Tu Hai Meri Jaanam" - Kumar Sanu, Alka Yagnik
"Sholo Me Shola Me" - Alisha Chinai, Sudesh Bhosle
"Aaj Naachte Hue Mar Jaana Hai" - Alka Yagnik

References

External links
 

Films scored by Raamlaxman
1994 films
1990s Hindi-language films